Djebel Ismail Laaouadj (Arabic: جبل اسماعيل لعوج) is a mountain located in the valley bounded by Djebel Aissa, in the wilaya of Naâma, a few kilometers from Ain Sefra.

Smail Laaouaj